The Where We Are Tour is a tour by Irish pop band, Westlife in support of their ninth studio album, Where We Are. The band toured in numerous counties in the United Kingdom and Ireland, Faroe Islands, Scotland and Wales. The 14 May date of the tour, which took place on The O2 Arena, London, had a live broadcast on Sky Box Office. It was also taped for a concert DVD, Where We Are Tour: Live from The O2, which was released on 29 November 2010. This was the third hottest tour of May 2010 according to Billboard.

Background
Before the album was released, different reports had been publicized, such as Westlife already having their 2010 tour with two dates in Croke Park on their minds. The tour was designed by Baz Halpin and produced by William Baker as said from an article with the content and design used for the tour. On 28 May, it was announced that Westlife would play an intimate and exclusive gig called "A night with Westlife" at The O2 in Dublin, the gig will be filmed and streamed live via The O2's blueroom website o2blueroom.i.e. The event took place on 20 August with a shorter and different setlist. The tour has been tagged by Stereoboard UK as the fourth most in-demand tour of 2010. The tour was seen by 360,000 fans.

Support acts
Irish girlband Wonderland was announced as one of the support act for Westlife and were the only to serve the full tour. On 27 April 2010, it was announced that American boyband WOW also served as an opening act for this tour, from 12 May in London's O2 up to 5 June in Dublin's Croke Park. On 16 May 2010, boyband The MacDonald Brothers was added as a support act exclusively for the Glasgow dates. JLS, runners up of The X Factor in 2008, alongside Jedward another X Factor contender. will support the band's return at Europe's fourth biggest stadium, Croke Park on 5 June 2010, which gives Westlife a total of four support acts for their Croke Park gig – Wonderland, Wow, JLS and Jedward. Indie rock group The Fuel will support the band on their Bristol date. McLean also supports the band on 18 July, Tamworth Festival.

Setlist
"Where We Are"
"What About Now"
"When You're Looking Like That"
"My Love"
"Uptown Girl"
"Swear It Again" (with acapella intro)
"Mandy"
"If I Let You Go" (contains excerpts from "All Out of Love")
"Shadows"
"Home"
"I'm Already There"
Medley:
"I Gotta Feeling"
"Halo" / "How to Break a Heart" 
"The Boys Are Back in Town"
"Sex on Fire"
"What Makes a Man"
"Flying Without Wings"
"World of Our Own"
"I'll See You Again"
"You Raise Me Up"

Notes
"Reach Out" and "Unbreakable" were performed at the Odyssey Arena on 2 May 2010.

Tour dates

Festivals and other miscellaneous performances
These concerts were a part of "Live at the Marquee"
This concert was a part of the "Midlands Music Festival"
This concert was a part of the "Sandown Park Music Nights"
This concert was a part of the "Summarfestivalurin"
This concert was a part of the "Newmarket Nights"
This concert was a part of the "Party in Paddock"
This concert was a part of "A Night in with Westlife"

Cancellations and rescheduled shows

Box office score data

Credits
Director: William Baker
Musical Director/Arrangements: Steve Anderson
Choreographer: Priscilla Samuels
Lighting Designer : Baz Halpburn
DVD Audio Mixed by Toby Alington and Steve Anderson

Band
Jamie Norton – Keyboards
Gareth Brown – Drums
Steve Octave – Bass
Ben Mark – Guitar

Live Concert Music DVD

A Night with Westlife / Westlife Acoustic Show - O2 Dublin
As part of their Where We Are Tour, the band did an acoustic performance along with The Irish Film Orchestra and choir on 20 August 2010.

Musical Director/Arranger – Steve Anderson
Strings Arranged by Steve Anderson and Cliff Masterson
Choir Arranged by Sean Gilligan
Mixed by Andy Knightley

Band
Vocals – Shane Filan, Mark Feehily, Kian Egan, Nicky Byrne
Drums – Gareth Brown
Piano – Jamie Norton
Bass – Steve Octave
Guitar – Ben Mark
Guitar – Luca Campaner
Guitar – Kian Egan
Percussion – Robert 'Skins' Anderson
Strings – The Irish Film Orchestra
Choir – The Hallelujah Choir

References

Westlife concert tours
2010 concert tours

da:The Back Home Tour